ABPD can stand for:
Pro-Música Brasil
Automated Business Process Discovery
Adult Polyglucosan Body Disease